Cranford railway station served the civil parish of Cranford, Northamptonshire, England, from 1866 to 1961 on the Kettering, Thrapston and Huntingdon Railway.

History 
The station was opened on 1 March 1866 by the Kettering, Thrapston and Huntingdon Railway. It closed to passengers on 2 April 1956 but remained open to goods traffic until 6 November 1961.

References 

Disused railway stations in Northamptonshire
Railway stations in Great Britain opened in 1866
Railway stations in Great Britain closed in 1956
1866 establishments in England
1961 disestablishments in England